1st Rifle Division may refer to:

 1st Siberian Rifle Division (Russian Empire) 
 1st Rifle Division (Soviet Union)
 1st Caucasian Rifle Division (Soviet Union) (1922–1931)
 1st Kazan Rifle Division (1922–1936)
 1st Rifle Division (1942)
 1st Rifle Division NKVD (1941–1942)
 1st Crimea Rifle Division (1941)
 1st Guards Rifle Division (1941–1942)
 1st Guards Rifle Division (1943–1945)

See also
 1st Division (disambiguation)